Disney's 102 Dalmatians: Puppies to the Rescue is a platform video game developed by Crystal Dynamics and published by Eidos Interactive for Microsoft Windows, PlayStation, Dreamcast and Game Boy Color. It is loosely based on the live-action Disney movie 102 Dalmatians.

Plot

Story

Console version
Two Dalmatian puppies, Oddball and Domino, are out in the backyard looking for treasure. They find a toy buried in a park that was made at one of Cruella de Vil's toy factories; this alludes to the fact that Cruella's toy sales are down. Facing financial ruin from lack of sales, Cruella sets a plan in motion: to reprogram her toys to capture any pets in sight so she can freeze them in "Super-Gloop" and sell them as a new line of realistic animal toys. Oddball and Domino are the only puppies in their family who have not been captured when they return from the park. Their parents, Dottie and Dipstick, set out to rescue their puppies, commanding Oddball and Domino to stay home. Instead the puppies set out to save their siblings, and their parents, who are captured along the way.

Game Boy Color version
Cruella de Vil has reprogrammed the toys of her toy factory into kidnapping all the Dalmatian puppies and locking them in cages to power the factory once they get older. Two of the puppies, Oddball and Domino, were able to escape through their cages due to their small size, and must free the puppies and escape the factory.

Setting
Similar to the film, the game is set in London, England. There are various levels in the game that are based on well-known places or monuments such as Regent's Park, Piccadilly, Big Ben and the Stonehenge.

Gameplay
The player can choose the role of Domino (voiced by Frankie Muniz in console versions) or Oddball (voiced by Molly Marlette). Over the course of the game, the player has several opportunities to collect 'stickers' towards a virtual sticker book which can be accessed through the level menu. Various actions within the game will unlock stickers. Generally, there is a sticker for exiting every level, collecting 100 bones each level and rescuing all the puppies in each level. Each level has its own individual tasks which will also grant stickers: completing a chore, defeating a henchman and solving puzzles. There are six stickers per a level, excluding Cruella levels, which combine together with mini games for their own sticker image. The stickers are like puzzle pieces that create a realistic picture.

Puppies to the Rescue is a 3-dimensional game with the ability to angle the camera in whichever direction will make it easiest for navigation. The player must avoid and bark at enemy toys to short-circuit them, or tumble into them to smash them.

Checkpoints within a level are places where the player will be sent back if a life is lost and are marked by a parrot named Waddlesworth. If a toy hurts the player four times, a life is lost. If a checkpoint has not been reached before a life is lost, the player is sent back to the starting point. Unlike the Game Boy Color version of the game where the toys are active after being broken, toys the players break stay broken. To regain lost health, the player can collect food.

Each level has a 'spirit animal friend' who will tell the player how to get through the level, and sometimes assign Oddball or Domino specific tasks to do in return for a reward or assistance. Certain levels also feature one of Cruella's three main henchmen from both films: Jasper and Horace from 101 Dalmatians, and Le Pelt from 102 Dalmatians. Unlike enemy toys, they are invincible from normal attacks and the player must perform a certain task instructed by the level's animal friend in order to defeat them. After a specific number of levels has been completed, the player will face Cruella in a series of boss battles which will unlock a minigame to play upon completion.

Reception

The Dreamcast version received "average" reviews according to the review aggregation website Metacritic.

David Zdyrko of IGN reviewed the PlayStation version and praised the voice-overs, cutscenes and mini-games, but criticized the game for being too easy in some places. Marc Nix of IGN reviewed the Dreamcast version and wrote: "The colors and emphasized building designs are vivid and sparkly. It's disappointing that the designers didn't even afford to sync the lips in the conversation scenes". Nix wrote of the Game Boy Color version: "The levels are sharp in creativity, and just as sharp in beauty. Though not as dazzling as can be done on the Game Boy Color, the levels are clean and vibrantly drawn".

Cathy Lu of Daily Radar praised the graphics and gameplay of the Game Boy Color version.

Notes

References

External links

2000 video games
101 Dalmatians video games
Video games based on adaptations
3D platform games
Crystal Dynamics games
Disney video games
Dreamcast games
Eidos Interactive games
Game Boy Color games
Multiplayer and single-player video games
PlayStation (console) games
Video games scored by Allister Brimble
Video games scored by Burke Trieschmann
Video games developed in the United States
Video games featuring female protagonists
Video games set in London
Windows games
Toys for Bob games
Digital Eclipse games